Thomas Robert Lundstedt  (born April 10, 1949), is a former professional baseball player who played in the Major Leagues primarily as a catcher from 1973 to 1975. He played at Prospect High School in Mt. Prospect, Illinois and the University of Michigan. He was originally drafted by the Los Angeles Dodgers in the 65th round of the 1967 Major League Baseball Draft but did not sign. He was later drafted by the Chicago Cubs in the 1st round of the 1970 Major League Baseball Draft and signed on June 9, 1970. After playing in 26 games in two seasons with the Cubs, he was traded to the Minnesota Twins on December 6, 1974 in exchange for Mike Adams. He played in 18 games with the Twins in 1975.

External links

1949 births
Living people
Chicago Cubs players
Minnesota Twins players
Major League Baseball catchers
Baseball players from Iowa
Quincy Cubs players
San Antonio Missions players
Midland Cubs players
Wichita Aeros players
Tacoma Twins players
Sportspeople from Davenport, Iowa